Champions Juniors, is a French comedy film from 1951, directed by Pierre Blondy, written by Roger Cauvin, starring Louis de Funès. It is a short film.

References

External links 
 
 Champions Juniors (1951) at the Films de France

1951 films
French comedy films
1950s French-language films
French black-and-white films
1951 comedy films
Films scored by Joseph Kosma
1950s French films